Jean-François Mattéi (9 March 1941 – 24 March 2014) was a French philosopher and professor of Greek philosophy and political philosophy at the University of Nice.

References

External links

1941 births
2014 deaths
French philosophers
French male non-fiction writers